Lynn Harrison (1907-1967) was an award-winning English film a TV editor who worked in Hollywood from the 1930s through the 1960s.

Selected filmography 

 Sleep, My Love (1948)
 Stork Bites Man (1947)
 The Adventures of Don Coyote (1947)
 Susie Steps Out (1946)
 Little Iodine (1946)
 Old Iron (1938)
 Second Best Bed (1938)
 The Lilac Domino (1937)
 Forbidden Music (1936)

References

External links

British film editors
English film editors
Emmy Award winners
1907 births
1967 deaths
British expatriates in the United States